Yankee Springs Township is a civil township of Barry County in the U.S. state of Michigan. The population was 4,065 at the 2010 census.  The township includes Yankee Springs State Park, a popular tourist destination in the summer.  The name was that of an Inn, a popular watering hole in the early days of the township.

Geography
Yankee Springs Recreation Area occupies  along much of the shore of Gun Lake and to the north and east.

Demographics
As of the census of 2000, there were 4,219 people, 1,628 households, and 1,253 families residing in the township. The racial makeup of the township was 97.35% White, 0.26% African American, 0.36% Native American, 0.19% Asian, 0.02% Pacific Islander, 0.45% from other races, and 1.37% from two or more races. Hispanic or Latino of any race were 1.56% of the population.

There were 1,628 households, out of which 33.0% had children under the age of 18 living with them, 65.7% were married couples living together, 6.9% had a female householder with no husband present, and 23.0% were non-families. 18.1% of all households were made up of individuals, and 5.9% had someone living alone who was 65 years of age or older.  The average household size was 2.59 and the average family size was 2.92.

In the township the population was spread out, with 26.1% under the age of 18, 6.7% from 18 to 24, 29.6% from 25 to 44, 25.5% from 45 to 64, and 12.1% who were 65 years of age or older.  The median age was 37 years. For every 100 females, there were 100.0 males.  For every 100 females age 18 and over, there were 98.5 males.

The median income for a household in the township was $52,661, and the median income for a family was $57,558. Males had a median income of $40,691 versus $31,250 for females. The per capita income for the township was $25,100.  About 2.8% of families and 2.5% of the population were below the poverty line, including 2.0% of those under age 18 and 2.1% of those age 65 or over.

References

External links
Yankee Springs Township official website

Townships in Barry County, Michigan
Grand Rapids metropolitan area
Townships in Michigan